Martin Davis and Tim Pawsat were the defending champions, but none competed this year. Davis retired from professional tennis during this season.

Scott Davis and David Pate won the title by defeating Peter Lundgren and Paul Wekesa 3–6, 6–1, 6–3 in the final.

Seeds

Draw

Draw

References

External links
 Official results archive (ATP)
 Official results archive (ITF)

Los Angeles Open (tennis)
1990 ATP Tour
Volvo Tennis Los Angeles
Volvo Tennis Los Angeles